Leach Highway is a  east-west arterial highway in the southern suburbs of Perth, Western Australia, primarily linking Kewdale and Perth Airport with the city of Fremantle.

It is allocated State Route 7 and is a dual carriageway for its entire length.

Route description
Leach Highway is one of the state's most important heavy vehicle routes. It links the major industrial areas of Kewdale and Welshpool with Western Australia's major container port at Fremantle.

Although the Leach Highway's western terminus is at Carrington Street in Palmyra, High Street continues for a further  into Fremantle, and connects it to the Stirling Highway.

History
Leach Highway is named for  Leach, former Commissioner of Main Roads Western Australia. Construction began in 1966, with the first section opened between its present western terminus at Carrington Street, Melville (now Palmyra), and High Road in Canning (now Willetton) in 1972.

It was soon extended eastward from High Road through to Manning Road, utilising the old timber Riverton Bridge over the Canning River via Barbican Street East and what is now Fern Road and Grayson Court. In 1976 it was further extended from Manning Road to Orrong Road, including bridges over Albany Highway in Bentley and the Armadale railway line in Welshpool. Then in 1978 the 4-lane concrete Shelley Bridge over Canning River opened, with Riverton Bridge retained for local traffic.

In the early 1980s the highway was extended further eastward, first to Hardey Road and, soon thereafter, to the new Beechboro-Gosnells Highway (now called Tonkin Highway) which remains as the highway's present eastern terminus.

Also around that time a number of intersections were built to coincide with new roads being built around Leach Highway. A parclo interchange was constructed at the newly extended Kwinana Freeway, and an intersection was constructed for the new Centenary Avenue in Wilson to improve access to the Western Australian Institute of Technology (WAIT), now called Curtin University. New at-grade intersections were built at Murdoch Drive and Winthrop Drive to service the new suburbs of Bateman and Winthrop.

Although not strictly Leach Highway, in 1985 Stirling Highway was extended southwards from its then terminus at Canning Highway to a new terminus at High Street (an extension of Leach Highway). This marked the final piece of an improved freight link between the Port of Fremantle and Perth's major industrial areas around Kewdale.

Apart from minor modifications, the Leach Highway remained largely unchanged until 2005/2006 when work on projects at Kwinana Freeway and Orrong Road commenced.

Orrong Road interchange
In November 2005, the state government announced plans for the construction of a $21 million diamond interchange at the intersection of Leach Highway and Orrong Road in Welshpool. Orrong Road, which is a continuation of Graham Farmer Freeway has experienced an increase in traffic by approximately 40% since the freeway was completed in 2000. The new bridge brought Leach Highway over Orrong Road, allowing, at the time, free-flowing traffic from Welshpool Road to Abernethy Road. The intersection was formerly Perth's worst blackspot. Approximately 70,000 vehicles, including substantial numbers of trucks, use the intersection daily. Funding for the project was made available through the sale of land reserved for the Fremantle Eastern Bypass. The interchange was completed in July 2007.

Bull Creek railway station
Bull Creek railway station was built at the interchange of Leach Highway and Kwinana Freeway for the new Perth-Mandurah railway. A new bridge was built immediately south of the present highway bridge to cater for bus access to the railway station. Alterations to the Kwinana Freeway on and off ramps to Leach Highway have also been undertaken, entailing modifications to the layout of the parclo interchange.

Gateway WA 

As part of the Gateway WA project, which commenced in 2013 and was completed in March 2016, Leach Highway was upgraded to a controlled access four lane expressway from Orrong Road into Perth Airport Terminals 1 and 2, through Airport Drive. This involved Perth's first full freeway to freeway interchange with Tonkin Highway and a compact diamond interchange with Abernethy Road. Airport Drive will also provide a major link to the planned consolidated Perth Airport complex.

Future upgrades

Welshpool Road interchange
In February 2018, then Federal Opposition transport and infrastructure spokesman Anthony Albanese pledged to put $46.5 million toward upgrading the Leach Highway and Welshpool Road to a grade-separated interchange if Labor won the upcoming Federal election. The intersection is considered to be one of Perth's most congested, with a high number of crashes occurring. The cost of the upgrade was at the time estimated to cost $93 million

In 2021, construction on site has started, continuing into 2023. The initial plan was to construct an overpass of Leach Highway over Welshpool Road, with a roundabout-interchange constructed below the overpass. It also included upgrading the bridge over the railway line leading to Armadale and also improving pedestrian access via sidewalks. Currently, the overpass has been constructed and more minor modifications will continue into 2023. Antony Albanese then came to win the federal election in 2022, but construction already commenced in 2021.

Major interchanges and exits
As Leach Highway is not limited access, a large number of the roads that Leach Highway are connected to are not controlled. Major intersections are at-grade and controlled. Exceptions are the Albany Highway, Orrong Road and Abernethy Road, which are grade separated in favour of Leach Highway. The first two are diamond interchanges, while the latter is a single-point urban interchange (SPUI). Although also grade-separated, the Centenary Avenue interchange is controlled by traffic lights on the westbound side of the highway.

See also

 Highways in Australia
 Highways in Western Australia
 Freeways in Australia
 Freeways in Western Australia

References

Further reading

Main Roads WA, Gateway WA Project Master Plan, Page 7

External links

Main Roads Western Australia

Highways and freeways in Perth, Western Australia
Highway 1 (Australia)